Shudo may refer to
Shudo (surname)
A term related to homosexuality in Japan
Hiroshima Shudo University in Japan
Shudo Junior and Senior High School in Hiroshima, Japan